The National Institute of Oceanography (NIO),, is a department of the Government of Pakistan and a major research institute of Ministry of Science and Technology (Pakistan). The NIO is a science and research executive organization located in Karachi, Sindh, Pakistan. The NIO' research and studies are funded by the Federal Government of Pakistan while the facilities are provided by the Sindh Government.

History
NIO was established in 1981 through a Government Resolution to conduct multidisciplinary research in oceanography in the coastal and offshore areas of Pakistan (EEZ 24,000 km²). The institute has 30 qualified marine scientists working on ocean biology/productivity, marine chemistry and environment, physical oceanography/coastal hydraulics, marine geology and geophysics.

See also 
 Pakistan Antarctic Programme
 Pakistan Meteorological Department
Jinnah Antarctic Station

References

External links
 NIO official website
 Ministry of Science and Technology

Oceanographic organizations
Science and technology in Pakistan
Pakistan Antarctic Programme
Pakistan federal departments and agencies
Research institutes in Pakistan
1981 establishments in Pakistan
Government agencies established in 1981